The Casas Viejas incident, also known as the Casas Viejas events, took place in 1933 in the village of Casas Viejas, in Cádiz Province, Andalusia.

Background 
The anarchist movement spread across Spain in the late 19th and early 20th centuries and was based on the ideas of Mikhail Bakunin and propagated by Giuseppe Fanelli. It urged oppressed workers to unite and organize against their oppressors: the state, the latifundista landowners, and the Church. It quickly took a hold among the long-exploited agricultural workers in Andalusia, who joined the Confederación Nacional del Trabajo (CNT) or the more radical Federación Anarquista Ibérica (FAI) and had some limited success in improving wages and working conditions. The anarchist movement was opposed by the government of Spain, which had been a republic since April 1931.

Incident 

In January 1933, workers of the CNT marched in the streets, demonstrated and believed that they were starting a revolution. Somehow during the demonstrations, two guards were wounded. The government's attempt to stamp out such revolutionary zeal came to a tragic head during January 11–12, 1933. The Civil Guard and Assault Guard arrived in Casas Viejas on January 11. Many of the villagers fled, but some anarchists tried to resist arrest and barricaded themselves in the home of an anarchist, Francisco Cruz Gutiérrez, who was nicknamed Seisdedos (meaning "Six fingers").

When guards under the command of Captain Rojas arrived, they set the house on fire with the anarchists and their families still inside. One anarchist, Maria Silva Cruz, survived the fire and emerged with a child, a boy, still alive. Soldiers and police then arrested anyone in the village who possessed a gun, marched them to the smoking ashes of the cottage and their dead colleagues, and shot them in the back. Twenty-four people died during the incident.

Legacy 
The massacre led to national outrage and weakened the position of the revolutionary left. There was considerable debate about whether the orders to kill had been issued by the President of the Second Spanish Republic, Niceto Alcalá-Zamora. That has never been proved, but it is believed to have contributed to his defeat in the following general election. Socialists, who had once supported the government, began to withdraw support for the new republic.

References 

1933 in Spain
Anarchism in Spain
Massacres in Spain
Conflicts in 1933
Anti-anarchism
History of Andalusia